Xixianykus is a genus of alvarezsaurid theropod dinosaur from the late Cretaceous period of China.

Discovery and naming
The fossil, holotype XMDFEC V0011, was found in the Majiacun Formation in Henan Province, China. The fossil consists of a partial skeleton, without the skull. Parts of the hind legs, pelvis and spine has also been recovered. Xixianykus is among the oldest of the derived alvarezsauroids, the parvicursorines, dated to the Santonian–Coniacian, as opposed to other parvicursorines, which are either Campanian or Maastrichtian.

The type species is Xixianykus zhangi described in 2010 by Xu Xing. The genus name refers to Xixia County and to the Greek word for claw ("onyx"). The latter is a common element used in names for Alvarezsaurids. The species name is in honor of Zhang Xinglao.

Description

It is one of the smallest-known dinosaurs (not counting avians). It appears to have many adaptations towards a cursorial (running) lifestyle. It was about 50 centimetres long but had  legs and a short femur combined with a long tibia and metatarsus, which are good indicators of it being a fast runner. It was probably covered in feathers.

References

External links

Agile 'roadrunner' dinosaur fossil discovered in China

Alvarezsaurids
Late Cretaceous dinosaurs of Asia
Fossil taxa described in 2010
Taxa named by Xu Xing